Giovanni Grignolo (born 25 February 1929) was an Italian equestrian. He competed in two events at the 1960 Summer Olympics.

References

External links
  

1929 births
Possibly living people
Italian male equestrians
Olympic equestrians of Italy
Equestrians at the 1960 Summer Olympics
Sportspeople from Rome